Fern Meyerson Smith (born November 7, 1933) is a former United States district judge of the United States District Court for the Northern District of California.

Education and career

Born on November 7, 1933, in San Francisco, California, Smith received an Associate of Arts degree from Foothill College in 1970, a Bachelor of Arts degree from Stanford University in 1972, and a Juris Doctor from Stanford Law School in 1975. She was in private practice in San Francisco from 1975 to 1986. She was a judge of the Superior Court of the State of California, County of San Francisco from 1986 to 1988. She was the Director of the Federal Judicial Center from 1999 to 2003.

Federal judicial service

Smith was nominated by President Ronald Reagan on May 9, 1988, to a seat on the United States District Court for the Northern District of California vacated by Judge Samuel Conti. She was confirmed by the United States Senate on July 26, 1988, and received her commission on July 27, 1988. She assumed senior status on May 15, 2003. Smith served in that capacity until her retirement on June 30, 2005.

References

Sources
 

1933 births
Living people
Lawyers from San Francisco
Foothill College alumni
Stanford University alumni
Stanford Law School alumni
California state court judges
Judges of the United States District Court for the Northern District of California
United States district court judges appointed by Ronald Reagan
20th-century American judges
Superior court judges in the United States
20th-century American women judges